A love meter, love tester or love teller may refer to:

A questionnaire, often found in magazines and on the Internet, that tries to rates the subject's love to someone or other love related subjects
Love tester machine, a type of amusement, which upon receiving credit tries to rate the subject's romanticism or love abilities
Love Tester, a novelty toy made by Nintendo tries to determine how much two persons love each other
Hand boiler, a glass sculpture sometimes used as a collector's item to measure love

See also
The Love Test, a 1935 British romantic comedy film
Amilie, or the Love Test, an opera in three acts by the Irish composer, William Michael Rooke
Annie's Coming Out, (also known as A Test of Love), a 1984 Australian drama film